Veliki Brat 2006 was the first season of Serbian version of Big Brother. The show premiered on 15 September 2006 and ran for 107 days, concluding on 31 December 2006. There were 14 housemates entered the house on Day 1. During the season, five more housemates were brought in. The winner of the season is Ivan Ljuba, a medical student and pianist from Belgrade. The season quickly became a rating hit on Serbian television but has also received plenty of criticism.

Generalna Proba 
A month prior to the start of the first season, a special smaller week-long edition called Veliki Brat: Generalna Proba was held for seven days, where twelve hopefuls entered the house for a chance to win a spot in the first season of Veliki Brat. The hopefuls were pre-recorded with the episodes shown a week later. In the end, the public voted for which male and female hopeful would win the prize of becoming an official housemate in the first season. The winners were announced on 15 September 2006, the evening that the first season launched.

Viewers crowned Jelena and Marko as the winners and they become official housemates of Veliki Brat 2006.

Hopefuls

Housemates 
Fourteen housemates entered the house on launch night. On day twelve, one housemate entered the house. On day twenty-nine, one more entered the house. On day fifty, three housemate entered the house. Out of 19 total housemates, 16 were from Serbia, 2 from Bosnia and Herzegovina and 1 from Montenegro.

Preview
The 1st season lasted for 107 days.
Day 2: The housemates publicly evicted Srba.
Day 3: The housemates got their first task "Best friends"
Day 8: The first love began to show. Marko and Daliborka gave each other massages and shared intimate conversations, which made people believe they were in love, but they both denied.
Day 12: A new housemate, Branislav entered the house. The housemates, or the viewers didn't like him and he was evicted after 2 weeks.
Day 14: The favourite for the victory, Miki, left the house. He said he couldn't handle the separation from the world. This made him an even bigger celebrity.
Day 15: The housemates gave Marko an amazing birthday party, with striptease and sexy dances between couples that everyone remembered.
Day 20: Marko starts separating from Daliborka, and gets together with Ena.
Day 29: Jadranka, who was presented as a Gold Woman, with gold hands entered the house. .. Many people criticized this, because she was too old, and said she won't stay in the house for more than 2 or 3 weeks. Still she managed to get to the semi final and left on day 106, one day before the Grand Final.
Day 50: Three more housemates - Sanja, Aleksandra and Sava entered the house. .. They will compete for half of the prize - 50.000 euros.
Days 57 - 63: There was a voting to bring back 1 housemate. Marko had the most votes. Maja was the runner up.
Day 64 - Marko entered the house again, and Nikola and Sanja were evicted. But Nikola and Sanja, together with Maja ( Which was 2nd place for returning in the house ), were put in a room inside the house, that nobody but them knew about - "The secret garden of  second chance. ..". They were to stay there for 3 days and take food and other needed things secretly from the house. Later, Big brother gave Sava a secret task - to help secret housemates and provide them with groceries. ..
Day 65: Marko and Ena started showing their love to the public. .. Many people thought they had sex under the sheets but they denied. ..
Day 76 The future winner Ivan succeeded in breaking one of the "Big Brother World Records" by memorizing all 202 items from given memory cards and surpassed the necessary number of 81 by far. He succeeded in 2 out of 4 tries and came close to breaking the record from the 'Guinness World Records' memory challenge.
Day 85 - Sava left the house voluntarily.
Day 89 - There was a big party in the house. It stayed remembered by the girls licking and sucking a banana, behaving with it like it was a penis. The public reacted to this scene and evicted Daliborka on Day 106, the first time she was nominated after it.
Day 106 - The presenter surprised the housemates telling them two of them will leave the house. Daliborka and Jadranka were evicted.

Nominations Table

Notes

External links 
 Production website (English)

2006 Serbian television seasons
2006